All Day with It is the third studio album by illScarlett, released on July 10, 2007. It was released in a standard edition containing one disk and as a limited edition which contained a second disk filled with bonus songs. illScarlett has gained growing popularity with this album and the first single, "Nothing Special", as the song reached #87 on the Billboard Canadian Hot 100 and #1 on the MuchMusic Countdown. The second single was  "Life of a Soldier" and the third single was "Who's Got It?"

Track listing

Ultimate Collector's Edition Bonus Disc

Charts

Album

Singles

Personnel

A&R
Greg Boggs
Adam Fujiki - Production Coordinator

Art/Photography
Adrian Forrow - Illustrations
John Wellman - Graphic Design
Richard Sibbald - Photography

Instruments
Alex Norman - Guitar
Johnny Doherty - Bass
Swavek Piorkowski - Drums
Will Marr - Guitar

Mixing/Engineering
Mike Fraser - Mixer
Csaba Petocz - Engineer

Producing/Mastering
Matthew Wilder - Producer
Ted Jensen - Mastering

Vocalists
Alex Norman - Lead
Johnny Doherty - Background

References

2007 albums
Albums produced by Matthew Wilder
Albums recorded at The Warehouse Studio
IllScarlett albums
Sony Music Canada albums